Orlov krš (meaning Eagle's Rock in English) is a mountain in Cetinje, Montenegro.

Orlov krš is the location of the mausoleum of Danilo I, Metropolitan of Cetinje. On 12 August, 2022, a spree shooting occurred, and the perpetrator fled into the mountain to evade police and was shot and killed by a local citizen.

References

Mountains of Montenegro
Cetinje